Presidential elections were held in Slovenia in 2002. The first round was held on 10 November, with a run-off held on 1 December after no candidate passed the 50% threshold in the first round. The result was a victory for Janez Drnovšek, who won 56.6% of the vote in the second round. Voter turnout was 72.04% in the first round and 65.24% in the second.

Results

References

Presidential elections in Slovenia
Slovenia
Presidential election
November 2002 events in Europe
December 2002 events in Europe